Olajumoke Amoke Olatunde George commonly known as Jumoke George is a Nigerian actress, film producer, and filmmaker.

She has acted in both Yoruba and English language films in Nollywood and has hosted television programs in Nigeria.

Early life and education 

George was born on 18 February. She hails from Ibadan, Oyo state. Her father was in the Nigerian military while her stepmother was a nurse who also works for the military.

George's mother and father separated while she was very young, with George remaining with her father and stepmother. After having disputes with her stepmother, her father threw George out of the house while she was in secondary school. So George then sheltered with friends.

George attended Command Children School Ann's Barracks Yaba, Lagos; the Army Children School Kano; the Anglican Grammar School, Orita mefa, Ibadan. George went to Government Technical College, Osogbo where she studied Business Administration.

Career 
George was introduced to acting at age eight by a family friend. She did stage drama with National Television Authority (NTA), Ibadan. She enrolled in a drama troupe at NTA Ibadan. Under the sponsorship of Victor Ashaolu, George entered the Yoruba movie industry.

After an inability to progress in the film industry, George became a member of the Freelance and Independent Broadcasters Association of Nigeria (FIBAN). George anchored 5 live programs which kept her very busy as away from acting.

Filmography 

 Eekan soso, 2009
 The Wedding Party, 2016
My Wife & I, 2017 
The Ghost and the Tout, 2018 
Love Castle, 2021

Award 
City People Movie Matriarch Recognition Award 2018

References 

Living people
Nigerian film actresses
Year of birth missing (living people)
Yoruba actresses
Actresses in Yoruba cinema
Nigerian stage actresses
20th-century births
Nigerian film award winners
Actresses from Oyo State
Nigerian film producers
21st-century Nigerian actresses
Nigerian media personalities
People from Oyo State
Nigerian television personalities
Nigerian television actresses